The 2009 Top League Challenge Series was the 2009 edition of the Top League Challenge Series, a second-tier rugby union competition in Japan, in which teams from regionalised leagues competed for promotion to the Top League for the 2009–10 season. The competition was contested from 11 to 25 January 2009.

Honda Heat and Ricoh Black Rams won promotion to the 2009–10 Top League, while Mazda Blue Zoomers and Toyota Industries Shuttles progressed to the promotion play-offs.

Competition rules and information

The top two teams from the regional Top East League, Top West League and Top Kyūshū League qualified to the Top League Challenge Series. The regional league winners participated in Challenge 1, while the runners-up participated in Challenge 2.

The top two teams in Challenge 1 won automatic promotion to the 2009–10 Top League, while the third-placed team in Challenge 1 and the Challenge 2 winner qualified to the promotion play-offs.

Qualification

The teams qualified to the Challenge 1 and Challenge 2 series through the 2008 regional leagues.

Top West League

The final standings for the 2008 Top West League were:

 Honda Heat, Toyota Industries Shuttles and World Fighting Bull qualified to the Second Phase.

 Honda Heat qualified for Challenge 1.
 Toyota Industries Shuttles qualified for Challenge 2.
 World Fighting Bull were dissolved.

Top East League

The final standings for the 2008 Top East League were:

 Ricoh Black Rams qualified for Challenge 1.
 NTT Communications Shining Arcs qualified for Challenge 2 after a play-off match against Mitsubishi Sagamihara DynaBoars.

The following match was played:

 Hino Red Dolphins were relegated to lower leagues.

Top Kyūshū League

The final standings for the 2008 Top Kyūshū League were:

 Chugoku Electric Power, Mazda Blue Zoomers and Mitsubishi Heavy Industries qualified to the Second Phase.
 Toshiba Oita and Yaskawa were relegated to lower leagues.

 Mazda Blue Zoomers qualified for Challenge 1.
 Mitsubishi Heavy Industries qualified for Challenge 2.

Challenge 1

Standings

The final standings for the 2009 Top League Challenge 1 were:

 Honda Heat and Ricoh Black Rams won promotion to the 2009–10 Top League.
 Mazda Blue Zoomers progressed to the promotion play-offs.

Matches

The following matches were played in the 2009 Top League Challenge 1:

Challenge 2

Standings

The final standings for the 2009 Top League Challenge 2 were:

 Toyota Industries Shuttles progressed to the promotion play-offs.

Matches

The following matches were played in the 2009 Top League Challenge 2:

See also

 2008–09 Top League
 Top League Challenge Series

References

2009 Challenge
2008–09 in Japanese rugby union
2009 rugby union tournaments for clubs